Stephen Rooney (born 1994) is an Irish hurler who plays for Antrim Championship club St. Paul's and at inter-county level with the Antrim senior hurling team. He usually lines out as a corner-back.

Career

A member of the St. Paul's club in Belfast, Rooney had been a member of the club's junior team for almost a decade when they won the County Junior Championship title in 2020. He made his first appearance on the inter-county scene as a member of the Antrim minor team that won the Ulster Minor Championship titles in 2011. Rooney made his debut with the Antrim senior hurling team in 2014
. Since then he has won two 
Joe McDonagh Cup titles
 and two National League Division 2A titles.

Honours

Tracefirst

Office Bowling Championship 2022

St. Paul's
Antrim Junior Hurling Championship: 2020

Antrim
Joe McDonagh Cup: Joe McDonagh Cup 2020 and 2022. 
National Hurling League Division 2A: 2017, 2020
Ulster Minor Hurling Championship: 2011

References

External links
Stephen Rooney profile at the Antrim GAA website

1994 births
Living people
Antrim inter-county hurlers
Sportspeople from Belfast